Elections to Colchester Borough Council were held on 6 May 2021. They were originally planned for 7 May 2020, but postponed until 2021 due to the COVID-19 pandemic. Seventeen members of the council (one-third of the whole) were up for election, one from each of the 17 wards. There were also two additional by-elections in Prettygate and Lexden & Braiswick wards, bringing the total number of elected members to nineteen.

Result Summary

Candidates by party

Result

Ward results

The Statement of Nominated Persons was released on 8 April 2021 detailing the persons standing as candidates at the Borough Council election.

Incumbent councillors are marked with an asterisk*

Berechurch

Castle

Greenstead

No Independent candidate as previous (-11.2).

Highwoods

Lexden & Braiswick

Marks Tey & Layer

Mersea & Pyefleet

No Independent (-28.6, -13.5) or UKIP (-7.3) candidates as previous.

Mile End

New Town & Christ Church

Old Heath & The Hythe

Prettygate

Rural North

Shrub End

St. Anne's & St. John's

Stanway

Tiptree

Wivenhoe

References

Colchester Borough Council election
2021
2020s in Essex